Cymothoe weymeri, or Weymer's glider, is a butterfly in the  family Nymphalidae. It is found in Liberia, Ivory Coast, Ghana, Nigeria, Cameroon, the Central African Republic and the Democratic Republic of the Congo. The habitat consists of forests.

The larvae feed on Flacourtiaceae species.

Subspecies
Cymothoe weymeri weymeri (Nigeria: south and the Cross River loop, Cameroon, Central African Republic, northern Democratic Republic of the Congo)
Cymothoe weymeri mulatta Belcastro, 1990 (Liberia, Ivory Coast, Ghana)

References

Butterflies described in 1904
Cymothoe (butterfly)